Maryborough West railway station is located on the North Coast line in Queensland, Australia. It serves the city of Maryborough.

History
Maryborough West was opened in 1989 as a replacement for Maryborough and Baddow stations, when the latter was bypassed by a new seven kilometre alignment that was built as part of the electrification of the North Coast line.

The station consists of one platform. Opposite the platform lie two crossing loops. South of the station, the old line to Maryborough station branches off. This remains in use to serve the Downer Rail railway workshops.

Services
Maryborough West is served by long-distance Traveltrain services; the Spirit of Queensland, Spirit of the Outback and the Bundaberg and Rockhamption Tilt Trains.

A Queensland Rail shuttle bus operates between the station and the former Maryborough station. A connecting road coach service operated by Wide Bay Transit also operates to Hervey Bay.

References

External links

Maryborough West station Queensland's Railways on the Internet

Buildings and structures in Maryborough, Queensland
Railway stations in Australia opened in 1989
Regional railway stations in Queensland
North Coast railway line, Queensland